In the Ramayana, Krodhavasha was the wife of the sage Kashyapa, the mother of Surabhi, and the daughter of Daksha. She gave birth to Asuras, or demons, who were also known as Krodhavasas. As she was very short-tempered, the children born to her were ferocious animals, birds, and fish, all monsters species with sharp teeth.

Offspring
In one version it is said that Krodhavasa had ten daughters: Mrgi, Mrgamanda, Harl, Bhadramata, Matarigl, Sarduli, Sveta, Surabhi, Sarasa, and Kadru.

According to Vanaparva of Mahabharata, some of Krodhavasa's sons worked as guards at Kubera's lotus lake. Once Bhima, one of the Pandavas, came to the lotus lake and started picking Saugandhika flowers. Krodhavasas went to Kubera complaining about it. It is also said that Krodhavasas worked in the army of Ravana of Ramayana fame.

A legend
According to a story from the epic Mahabharata, which was adopted into a drama, Bhima is on a pilgrimage to Gandharvamadana to pluck some Saugandhika flowers to gift them to Draupadi. A Brahmin sage warns Bhima not to go there, as he himself was incapable of going up the mountain to pluck the flowers because of old age. Meanwhile, a Saugandhika flower from the inaccessible mountain is carried by the wind and falls on Draupadi, while she had sent Bhima to fetch that very flower. Bhima, holding his mace and blowing a conch, walks through the thick forest to scare wild animals on his way to the mountain lake. While he walks through the forest, a strong wind (Vayu, representing Bhima's father) carries to him the sweet smell of the flower. His approach scares away the demons and spirits who were guarding the lake. Bhima then gathers the flowers from the lake. Krodhavasa then enters the lake with a drawn sword and threatens Bhima. Bhima informs the demon that even Rama, a man, could kill demons. Bhima then attacks Krodhavasa with his mace and breaks his sword. Krodhavasa runs away in fright. Then Kubera appears on the scene and tells Bhima to take as many flowers as he wants.

References

Bibliography

Characters in Hindu mythology